Elections to the Zetland County Council were held on 12 May 1970 as part of Scottish local elections. Elections were held in every part of Shetland except Lerwick to elect 24 landward members to the County Council, who would be joined by nine nominated members from the Lerwick Town Council.  Only five of 24 seats were contested.

Incumbent Council Convener Robert Johnson was unanimously re-elected for a second term after the election but would only serve a further two months until his death in July, after which Edward Thomason was elected to the position.

Election results

Ward Results

By-elections since 1970

References

Zetland
Shetland Islands Council elections